The A.G. Ballie Memorial School is a school in New Glasgow, Nova Scotia, Canada. It is in the Celtic Region of the Chignecto-Central Regional School Board. The school is named after Alexander Grant Baillie, a prominent member of the community, teacher, and former supervisor of the elementary schools in New Glasgow. The school was formally opened in August 1969.

References

Elementary schools in Nova Scotia
New Glasgow, Nova Scotia